The 1998–99 Phoenix Coyotes season was the Coyotes' third season in Phoenix, the franchise's 20th season in the NHL and 27th overall. The Coyotes qualified for the playoffs for the fourth consecutive season, but they were upset in the Western Conference Quarterfinals by the St. Louis Blues, losing in seven games after being up three games to one. It was the third time in the decade that the Jets/Coyotes had blown a three games to one series lead. The first coming in 1990 and the other coming in 1992.

Regular season

Final standings

Playoffs

Western Conference Quarterfinals

(W4) Phoenix Coyotes vs. (W5) St. Louis Blues 
The series started in Phoenix. Game 1 was won by St. Louis by a score of 3–1. In Game 2, the Coyotes won 4–3 in overtime. In St. Louis, Phoenix won both Games 3 and 4 — Game 3 was won by a score of 5–4 and Game 4 was won by a score of 2–1. Game 5 shifted back to Phoenix, where St. Louis won 2–1 in overtime. Game 6 went back to St. Louis, where the Blues won 5–3. In Game 7, St. Louis won 1–0 in overtime in Phoenix, winning the series 4–3.

Player statistics

Regular season
Scoring

Goaltending

Playoffs
Scoring

Goaltending

Transactions

Trades

Waivers

Free agents

Draft picks
Phoenix's draft picks at the 1998 NHL Entry Draft held at the Marine Midland Arena in Buffalo, New York.

See also
 1998–99 NHL season

References
Bibliography
 
 

P
P
Arizona Coyotes seasons